Heliconius clysonymus, the Clysonymus longwing, yellow longwing or montane longwing, is a species of Heliconius butterfly found in Central and South America.

Subspecies
Listed alphabetically:
H. c. clysonymus Latreille, [1817] – (Colombia)
H. c. hygiana (Hewitson, 1867) – (Ecuador)
H. c. montanus Salvin, 1871 – montane longwing (Costa Rica, Panama)
H. c. tabaconas Brown, 1976 – (Peru, Costa Rica)

References

External links
 Clysonymus longwing, Neotropical Butterflies
 Yellow longwing, Discover Life

clysonymus
Nymphalidae of South America
Butterflies described in 1817